Jon Lilletun (23 October 1945 – 21 August 2006) was a Norwegian politician active in the Christian Democratic Party.

Background

Lilletun was born in Western Vossestrand, now a part of the municipality of Voss. His father owned a farm and also worked as a mailman. Lilletun was raised as a Pentecostal, and his family always tithed to the religious community.

After his mandatory 8-year primary education, Lilletun's family was unable to finance attendance at a higher level of school with an academic track. Lilletun worked as an apprentice at a local merchant and attended various trade schools. In 1974 he opened his own retail store that went bankrupt within a few years. He was subsequently convicted of negligence in his accounting practices and sentenced to a 55-day prison term, which he served.

He attributed this experience with a new outlook on life, and from 1975 to 1988 he worked for the municipality of Vennesla on issues related to youth. In 1982 he ran for election as the mayor of Vennesla, but lost in a landslide defeat. During this time he also moved from the Pentecostal movement to the Church of Norway.

Political career

Representing the county of Vest-Agder, he served as a deputy member of the Norwegian parliament from 1981 to 1985, and as an elected member from 1989 until his death. In the spring of 2005 he took sick leave, and his deputy Sigmund Kroslid filled in for him. After his death he was replaced by Dagrun Eriksen.

Lilletun was the Minister of Education, Research and Church Affairs 1997-2000, in the first cabinet of Kjell Magne Bondevik. Under his administration, the Norwegian Center for Studies of Holocaust and Religious Minorities was approved.

Among his other parliamentary appointments were:

Storting Committees

 Since 2001: member of the Standing Committee on Foreign Affairs and the Enlarged Foreign Affairs Committee
 2000-2001: member of the Standing Committee on Business and Industry
 1993-1997: chair of the Standing Committee on Education, Research and Church Affairs
 1990-1993: member of the Standing Committee on Church and Education
 1989-1990: member of the Standing Committee on Local Government and the Environment

Other
 Since 2001: member of the Norwegian delegation for Relations with the European Parliament
 Since 2000: member of the Norwegian delegation to the NATO Parliamentary Assembly, Deputy Head of the delegation since 2001
 1993-1997: alternate member of the Storting delegation to the Nordic Council
 2001-2005: chair of the Christian Democratic Party parliamentary group

Since 2005, he was also vice president of the Lagting.

The cause of his death was cancer.

External links
 Interview with Lilletun in 1997
 Official parliamentary biography

1945 births
2006 deaths
Government ministers of Norway
Christian Democratic Party (Norway) politicians
Deaths from cancer in Norway
Members of the Storting
21st-century Norwegian politicians
20th-century Norwegian politicians
Ministers of Education of Norway